Kevin Walsh may refer to:

 Kevin Walsh (English footballer) (born 1928), English football wing half
 Kevin Walsh (Australian rules footballer) (born 1962), former Australian rules footballer
 Kevin Walsh (Gaelic footballer) (born 1969), Irish Gaelic football manager and former player
 Kevin Walsh (bowls) (born 1969), Australian lawn bowler
 Kevin J. Walsh (born 1975), American film producer
 Kevin Walsh (neuropsychologist), Australian pioneer of the profession of clinical neuropsychology
 Kevin Walsh (politician)
 Kevin Walsh, founder of Forgotten NY